Raje Vishveshvar Rao  a.k.a. Raja Saheb, Aheri or Raja Saheb (c. 1926 – 27 March 1997) was an Indian Gond Raje (king) and politician. He was a Member of Parliament of India and was member of the 6th Lok Sabha. Raje Vishveshvar Rao represented the Chandrapur constituency of Maharashtra and was a member of the Bharatiya Lok Dal political party.

Early life 
Rao was born in Aheri, in the state of Maharashtra. Rao inherited the monarchy and became the Raje of Aheri.

Political career
Rao joined politics after Indian independence. Rao held the position of MLA in the Maharashtra Legislative Assembly for three terms before becoming a Member of Parliament in the 6th Lok Sabha of India. He was a member of the Bharatiya Lok Dal political party.

Posts held

See also

Raja & Monarchy in ancient India
6th Lok Sabha
Lok Sabha
Politics of India
Parliament of India
Government of India
Bharatiya Lok Dal
Chandrapur

References 

1920s births
1997 deaths
India MPs 1977–1979
Lok Sabha members from Maharashtra
Marathi politicians
Bharatiya Lok Dal politicians
People from Chandrapur
People from Chandrapur district
20th-century Indian monarchs